The Rockford Forest Citys played their first and only season in 1871 as a charter member of the National Association of Professional Base Ball Players. They finished ninth in the league with a record of 4–21. They folded after the season.

Regular season

Rockford finished with 4 wins and 21 losses, 15½ games behind the champion Philadelphia Athletics club and good for last place. Player-manager Scott Hastings was found to have violated the "60 day rule" implemented by the league—if a player switched teams during the season, the team had to bench him for 60 days before he could play. Hastings had jumped from a Louisiana team to the Forest Citys in the spring and immediately begun playing for Rockford. This complaint was brought before the league, and the Forest Citys were forced to forfeit 4 of their wins.

The star of the team was Cap Anson, who hit .325 for the Forest Citys and would go on to become the player-manager of the Chicago White Stockings for over 20 seasons. Anson was inducted into the Hall of Fame in 1939.

Season standings

Record vs. opponents

Roster

Player stats

Batting

Starters by position
Note: Pos = Position; G = Games played; AB = At bats; H = Hits; Avg. = Batting average; HR = Home runs; RBI = Runs batted in

Other batters
Note: G = Games played; AB = At bats; H = Hits; Avg. = Batting average; HR = Home runs; RBI = Runs batted in

Pitching

Starting pitchers
Note: G = Games pitched; IP = Innings pitched; W = Wins; L = Losses; ERA = Earned run average; SO = Strikeouts

Relief pitchers
Note: G = Games pitched; IP = Innings pitched; W = Wins; L = Losses; ERA = Earned run average; SO = Strikeouts

References
1871 Rockford Forest Citys season at Baseball Reference

Rockford Forest Citys
Rockford Forest Citys season